The following is a list of the 44 municipalities (comuni) of the Province of Reggio Emilia, Emilia-Romagna, Italy.

List

See also
List of municipalities of Italy

References

Reggio Emilia